Nicholas Dockstader (January 4, 1802 – November 9, 1871) was the third mayor of Cleveland, Ohio. He served only one year in 1840.

Dockstader was born in Albany, New York to Jacob and Angela (Hanson) Dockstader.  Nicholas had two brothers, Richard and Butler.  Dockstader and his brothers moved to Cleveland in 1826.  He soon became the leading fur trader in the Northeast Ohio region after he began dealing hats, caps, and furs to the local Indians.  In 1834 he became the treasurer of the Cleveland & Newburgh Railway.  In 1835 Dockstader became the treasurer of the village of Cleveland.  He was then elected alderman after the city was incorporated in 1836 and elected to that position again in 1838.  From 1837 to 1838 Dockstader was chosen as a delegate to the county and state Whig conventions.  It was because of this popularity that he was elected mayor in 1840.  He served one term as mayor, after which he returned to private business.

Dockstader was married to Harriet Judd (1805–1837).  Their 5 children were William, Richard, Charles, Julia, and Elisabeth.  Dockstader died in Cleveland and is buried in Woodland Cemetery.

References
 The Encyclopedia Of Cleveland History by Cleveland Bicentennial Commission (Cleveland, Ohio), David D. Van Tassel (Editor), and John J. Grabowski (Editor) 

Dockstader, Nicohlas
1802 births
1871 deaths
Ohio Whigs
19th-century American politicians
Burials at Woodland Cemetery (Cleveland)